The Two Rivals may refer to:

 The Two Rivals (1944 film), a 1944 Argentine film
 The Two Rivals (1960 film), a 1960 Italian-Spanish film